To the Bone is a 1994 live album by the Kinks. Recorded partly at Konk Studios with a small audience, and partly during their 1993 American tour and the 1994 UK tour, it was the band's final release before their breakup in 1996.

Production
Some tracks were recorded at Konk Studios during April 1994 with a small audience in an Unplugged style, other tracks were recorded live in Portsmouth in March 1994, and "You Really Got Me" was recorded live in Philadelphia in August 1993. All the songs had been previously released as studio recordings.

Release
Released 3 October 1994 in the U.K. on the band's own Konk label. An EP-single was released off the album to promote its release, "Waterloo Sunset '94", which in addition to a live take of "You Really Got Me" featured the unreleased demos "Elevator Man" and "On the Outside", both recorded in 1976.

In 1996, an expanded double CD-version with 29 tracks was released in the U.S. on Guardian/Konk. Two new studio tracks – "To The Bone" and "Animal" – were included on the double-disc U.S. version, while two tracks on the shorter U.K. issue – "Waterloo Sunset" and "Autumn Almanac" – were omitted.

Reception
Stephen Thomas Erlewine, in a review for AllMusic, felt that the songs suited the stripped back "Unplugged" style, but the album as a whole was little more than a "pleasant diversion".

Track listing

1994 1-CD UK release
All tracks by Ray Davies, except where noted.

 "All Day and All of the Night" – 4:26
 "Apeman" – 4:06
 "Tired of Waiting for You" – 1:49
 "See My Friends" – 3:24
 "Death of a Clown" (Ray Davies, Dave Davies) – 2:35
 "Waterloo Sunset" – 3:20
 "Muswell Hillbilly" – 3:06
 "Better Things" – 4:50
 "Don't Forget to Dance" – 2:38
 "Autumn Almanac" – 1:54
 "Sunny Afternoon" – 1:46
 "Dedicated Follower of Fashion" – 3:54
 "You Really Got Me" – 3:49

1996 2-CD US release
All tracks by Ray Davies, except where noted.

Disc one
 "All Day and All of the Night" – 4:26
 "Apeman" – 4:06
 "Tired of Waiting for You" – 1:49
 "See My Friends" – 3:24
 "Death of a Clown" (Dave Davies) – 2:35
 "Muswell Hillbilly" – 3:06
 "Better Things" – 4:50
 "Don't Forget to Dance" – 2:38
 "Sunny Afternoon" – 1:46
 "Dedicated Follower of Fashion" – 3:54
 "Do It Again" (Acoustic) – 1:46
 "Do It Again" – 3:55

Disc two
 "Celluloid Heroes" – 5:21
 "Picture Book" – 2:34
 "The Village Green Preservation Society" – 2:26
 "Do You Remember Walter?" – 3:44
 "Set Me Free" – 2:37
 "Lola" – 4:29
 "Come Dancing" – 3:53
 "I'm Not Like Everybody Else" – 5:28
 "Till the End of the Day" – 2:37
 "Give the People What They Want" – 3:57
 "State of Confusion" – 3:24
 "Dead End Street" – 2:36
 "A Gallon of Gas" – 5:21
 "Days" – 3:17
 "You Really Got Me" – 3:41
 "Animal" – 3:37
 "To the Bone" – 4:30

References

The Kinks live albums
1994 live albums
Albums produced by Ray Davies